Klokočov is a village and municipality in Michalovce District in the Košice Region of eastern Slovakia.

History
In historical records the village was first mentioned in 1358.

Geography
The village lies at an altitude of 117 metres and covers an area of  (2020-06-30/-07-01).

Population 
The municipality has a population of 423 people (2020-12-31).

Culture
The village has a public library and a football pitch.

It is also a major religious pilgrimage site for Greek Catholics in the Košice Region, with the local Greek Catholic church as the centrepiece of pilgrimages.

Genealogical resources

The records for genealogical research are available at the state archive "Statny Archiv in Presov, Slovakia"

 Roman Catholic church records (births/marriages/deaths): 1742-1935 (parish B)
 Greek Catholic church records (births/marriages/deaths): 1822-1922 (parish A)

Transport
Klokočov lies next to a main road connecting Michalovce with the villages on the northern shore of Zemplínska Šírava and the villages in the northern parts of the Sobrance District, further to the east.

The village has regular bus service.

Tourism

A local part of the municipality is the Kamenec tourism area, with accommodation and facilities for water sports. Kamenec is one of the major recreational areas on the northern shores of the Zemplínska Šírava reservoir.

Gallery

See also
 List of municipalities and towns in Michalovce District
 List of municipalities and towns in Slovakia

References

External links

https://web.archive.org/web/20071006173841/http://www.statistics.sk/mosmis/eng/run.html
Surnames of living people in Klokocov

Villages and municipalities in Michalovce District